"Yes" is a song by Ben and Tan that would have gone to represent Denmark in the Eurovision Song Contest 2020. The song was released as a digital download on 8 March 2020.

Eurovision Song Contest

The song would go represent Denmark in the Eurovision Song Contest 2020, after Ben and Tan was selected through Dansk Melodi Grand Prix 2020, the music competition that selects Denmark's entries for the Eurovision Song Contest. On 28 January 2020, a special allocation draw was held which placed each country into one of the two semi-finals, as well as which half of the show they would perform in. Denmark was placed into the second semi-final, to be held on 14 May 2020, and was scheduled to perform in the second half of the show.

Track listing

Charts

Release history

References

2020 singles
2020 songs
Eurovision songs of 2020
Eurovision songs of Denmark
Songs written by Jimmy Jansson
Songs written by Linnea Deb